A Barrel of Laughs, A Vale of Tears is a children's book written and illustrated by Jules Feiffer, first published in 1995 by HarperCollins. The first edition was a library binding with 180 pages.

WorldCat Identities contains records of seven editions of this book in 765 libraries worldwide 

There is a musical adaptation of the book with music by Julia Adolphe and libretto by Stephanie Fleischmann

Synopsis
A Barrel of Laughs, a Vale of Tears follows the young prince Roger, who haphazardly sets out on a quest to prepare himself to become king. The book expresses the emotions of various individuals through two long-lost lovers reunited, several unlikely couples marrying, and a friend-turned-evil's attempts for revenge. While Roger himself starts out as pure and innocent, he seems somewhat naive and incapable of feeling serious.

The quest, which contains plenty of sad events, gradually brings Roger to a point where he still is humorous, but is caring about specific individuals as opposed to finding shallow humor in everything. The beautiful Princess Petulia, and her servant, likewise, find similar changes in personality through their experiences, as they go from being bitterly indifferent to loving and plainspoken to kinder respectively.

Publication history
 
 
 
 
 
 
  (German language)

References

American children's novels
1995 American novels
1995 fantasy novels
Children's fantasy novels
HarperCollins books
Works by Jules Feiffer
1995 children's books